Pouria Amirshahi (born 27 March 1972 in Shemiran, Iran), is a French politician. He was a Deputy in the National Assembly for the Ninth constituency for French residents overseas.

References

External links

1972 births
Living people
Lycée Buffon alumni
Pantheon-Sorbonne University alumni
Socialist Party (France) politicians
Iranian emigrants to France
French politicians of Iranian descent
Deputies of the 14th National Assembly of the French Fifth Republic